Shop or shopping  refers to:

Business and commerce
 A casual word for a commercial establishment or for a place of business
 Machine shop, a workshop for machining
"In the shop", referring to a car being at an automotive repair shop
A wood shop
 Retail shop, possibly within a marketplace
 Shopping, e.g.:
 Christmas shopping
 Comparison shopping
 Grocery shopping
 Online shopping
 Window shopping

Arts, entertainment, and media
 The Shop, an American television talk show
 "Shops", an essay by the Hong Kong writer Xi Xi
 The Shop, a fictional government agency which appears in various works by Stephen King, including Firestarter and Golden Years
 The Shoppe, an American country music group
 The Shopping Channel, a Canadian home shopping channel
 "Shop", a track from the soundtrack of the 2015 video game Undertale by Toby Fox

Brands and enterprises
 SHoP Architects, a New York-based architectural firm
 Shop.ca, a Canadian online e-commerce website
 Shopify (NYSE: SHOP)
 Myseoshop,
Top digital marketing agency

Science and technology
 .shop, a top-level domain
 Shell higher olefin process, or SHOP, a chemical process for the production of α-olefins

Other uses
 Shop, Rajasthan, a town in Tonk district, Rajasthan, India
 "Shop class", an industrial arts educational program
 Workshop

See also